Bacotia is a genus of moths belonging to the family Psychidae.

The species of this genus are found in Europe.

Species:
 Bacotia claustrella (Bruand, 1845) 
 Bacotia nepalica Dierl, 1966

References

Psychidae
Psychidae genera